VA-6 has the following meanings:
Attack Squadron 6 (U.S. Navy)
Virginia State Route 6
Virginia's 6th congressional district